Ana Veciana-Suarez (born 1956 in Cuba) is a syndicated columnist, author and former journalist. Her columns are distributed by Tribune Content Agency. She lives in Miami, Florida.

Early life and education 

Veciana-Suarez was born in Havana, Cuba. Her family migrated to the United States when she was six years old. Her father Antonio Veciana is a Cuban exile who was involved in several assassination attempts against Fidel Castro.

Veciana-Suarez graduated summa cum laude from the University of South Florida. She has worked at The Miami News, The Palm Beach Post and most recently, The Miami Herald. For her journalism work, she was awarded a National Headliner, a Clarion Award, a Green Eyeshade and two Sunshine State Awards.

Published works 

 The Chin Kiss King (Plume, 1998). It was originally published in English by Farrar Strass Giroux in 1997. It was re-issued in 2015.
 Birthday Parties in Heaven (Plume, 2000)
 Flight to Freedom (Scholastic, 2002). It was reissued in 2016.

With the Media Institute
 Hispanic Media: Impact and Influence (1990)
 Hispanic Media, USA: A Narrative Guide to the Print and Electronic Hispanic News Media in the United States (1987)

References

External links
 — Biography on Scholastic

1956 births
Living people
People from Miami
People from Havana
American women journalists
21st-century American women